Claude Vibart Wight (28 July 1902 – 4 October 1969) was a West Indian cricketer who played two Tests in the 1920s and 1930s.

Wight was born in Georgetown, British Guiana and made his first-class debut in 1925.  He was a useful middle-order batsman and an occasional bowler who represented British Guiana against the visiting M.C.C. in February 1926 and a few days later he represented the West Indies, not then a Test playing nation, against the same tourists, scoring 90 in the second match and sharing a seventh-wicket partnership of 173 with Snuffy Browne.  

In 1928, despite having no leadership experience, Wight was appointed vice-captain for West Indies’ first Test visit and series against England. It was not a successful tour for Wight, scoring just 343 runs (average 20.17) but he made his Test debut in the third match of the series played at the Oval, scoring 23 and 12 not out. His only other Test was the third match of the return series, played in February 1930 at his hometown of Bourda, British Guiana.  Unfortunately, his contribution to a West Indian victory was just 10 and 22.  

In all first-class matches, Wight scored 1,547 runs at a respectable average of 30.94 and amassed three scores over 100.  These came in January 1928 at Bridgetown, Barbados, for Rest of West Indies v. a 'British Born' team when he scored 119 not out, in September 1934 at Bourda for British Guiana v. Barbados when he scored 130 and 76, and in October 1937 again at Bourda for British Guiana against Trinidad when he hit his own wicket with his score at 127.  His death in Kingston, Georgetown, Guyana, in 1969 went unrecorded in Wisden at the time.  

Wight's nephew Leslie Wight also played Test cricket for the West Indies, while eight other relatives played first-class or important matches.

References
 Martin-Jenkins, C. (1996) World Cricketers - A Biographical Dictionary, Oxford University Press: Oxford. .  
 Frindall, B. (2000) The Wisden Book of Test Cricket Headline Book Publishing: London. .
 Lawrence, B. & Goble, R. (1991) The Complete Record of West Indian Test Cricketers, ACL & Polar Publishing (UK) Ltd. .

External links

BBC summary of 1928 series

1902 births
1969 deaths
West Indies Test cricketers
Pre-1928 West Indies cricketers
Guyanese cricketers
Guyana cricketers
Sportspeople from Georgetown, Guyana